Southwestern School District is a school district that serves Hazel Green, Wisconsin, as well as surrounding areas such as Kieler and Louisburg. As of 2020, the district administrator was John Castello. The district has a 15.1 to 1 student-to-teacher ratio. 

Due to a decrease in student population, the Wisconsin Department of Public Instruction commissioned a study that recommended the district consolidate with the Benton, Cuba City, and Shullsburg School Districts  It already shares programs and staff with the Benton and Cuba City school Districts for computer services and software.

Demographics
The district served 581 students in the 2008–2009 school year. The students of the district were 99% white.

Schools
Southwestern High School
Southwestern Elementary School

References

External links
Southwestern School District website
District profile from GreatSchools.net
Profile from the state of Wisconsin

Education in Grant County, Wisconsin
School districts in Wisconsin